The 2013 Toppserien is the twenty-seventh season of top-tier women's football in Norway since its establishment in 1987. A total of 12 teams are contesting the league, ten returning from the 2012 season and the two teams promoted from the First Division, Avaldsnes and Medkila.

The season started on 13 April 2013 and is planned to end on 2 November 2013.

Teams

League table

Top goalscorers

References

External links
Toppserien - Norges Fotballforbund
Season on soccerway.com

Toppserien seasons
Top level Norwegian women's football league seasons
Norway
Norway
1